Brandi McCain (born September 21, 1979) is a former American college and professional basketball player who was a guard in the Women's National Basketball Association (WNBA) for a single season in 2002.  McCain played college basketball for the University of Florida, and the played professionally for the Cleveland Rockers of the WNBA.

Early years 

McCain attended Silsbee High School in Silsbee, Texas, and she played high school basketball for the Silsbee Tigers.  She was recognized as a high school All-American by the Women's Basketball Coaches Association (WBCA), and participated in the WBCA High School All-America Game, during which she scored eight points.

College career 

McCain accepted an athletic scholarship to attend the University of Florida in Gainesville, Florida, and played for coach Carol Ross's Florida Gators women's basketball team from 1998 to 2002.  As a Lady Gator, she was a first-team All-Southeastern Conference (SEC) selection in 1999 and 2001, a second-team selection in 2000, and a first-team All-American in 2001.  McCain was also a team captain in 2000 and 2002.  She graduated from the University of Florida with a bachelor's degree in 2002.

Florida statistics

Source

USA Basketball

McCain played on the team presenting the US at the 1999 World University Games held in Palma de Mallorca, Spain.  The team had a 4–2 record and earned the silver medal.  McCain averaged 6.0 points per game.

Professional career 

The Cleveland Rockers picked McCain in the second round (twenty-fourth pick overall) in the 2002 WNBA Draft, and she played a single season for the Rockers in 2002.  She played mostly in a reserve role, appearing in thirty-one games and starting two of them.

See also 

 List of Florida Gators in the WNBA
 List of University of Florida alumni

References

External links 
  Brandi McCain – Official WNBA player profile

1979 births
Living people
American women's basketball players
Basketball players from Texas
Cleveland Rockers players
Florida Gators women's basketball players
People from Silsbee, Texas
Universiade silver medalists for the United States
Universiade medalists in basketball
Guards (basketball)
Medalists at the 1999 Summer Universiade